"Pass It Around" is the debut single by British rock band Smokie. It was released on 21 March 1975 as the only single from the album of the same name.

Although the single was promoted on various TV shows, it failed to chart in the UK.

Track listing

References

External links
Smokie discography 1975-1982

1975 debut singles
Smokie (band) songs
Songs written by Nicky Chinn
Songs written by Mike Chapman
Song recordings produced by Mike Chapman
1975 songs
RAK Records singles